Titevand (also Romanized as Tītevand; also known as Eshkaft-e Tīneh Vand and Tīneh Vand) is a village in Poshtkuh-e Rostam Rural District, Sorna District, Rostam County, Fars Province, Iran. At the 2006 census, its population was 23, in 4 families.

References 

Populated places in Rostam County